Alpheias bipunctalis is a species of snout moth in the genus Alpheias. It was described by George Hampson in 1919 and is known from Jamaica.

References

Moths described in 1919
Cacotherapiini
Moths of the Caribbean